Irnerio Bertuzzi (October 9, 1919 – October 27, 1962) was an Italian military aviator of World War II who also served as personal pilot to Enrico Mattei, head of the Italian petroleum company Eni. He died at age of 43 when the aircraft he was flying was sabotaged to crash.

Military career
During World War II he flew Savoia-Marchetti SM.79 aircraft in the Aerosiluranti (torpedo bomber) squadrons of Regia Aeronautica with the rank of Tenente. After 8 September 1943 he chose to fight for the Italian Social Republic as a member of the Gruppo Aerosiluranti Buscaglia-Faggioni. Commander of the 2nd Squadron of Aeronautica Nazionale Repubblicana, he led several torpedo bombing raids against the Allied fleet at Anzio and Gibraltar, often by night, since Bertuzzi was exceptionally skilled in instrument flight.

Bertuzzi was awarded two Silver Medals and one Bronze Medal of Military Valor during the war.

Flying for Mattei
In the years following World War II, after a long period flying with Alitalia and a stint with Douglas DC-6s in South America, he was hired by Eni in 1958 to lead the company's aircraft fleet. The chairman, Enrico Mattei, trusted him implicitly despite his being a decorated ex-partisan and Bertuzzi an ex-fascist.

Bertuzzi was at the controls of Mattei's Morane-Saulnier MS.760 Paris executive jet (I–SNAP) when it crashed in the countryside surrounding Bascapè in the province of Pavia, on 27 October 1962. Besides Bertuzzi and Mattei, American Time–Life journalist William McHale was also killed in the crash. Shortly before takeoff on the fateful flight, he had announced to Mattei his intention to quit his job to take the lead in a new society called Alis.

Four months after the crash, the first enquiry was dismissed, attributing the liability of the disaster to the pilot's physical and psychological status and to technical malfunctions. In 2003, however the inquiry of the Pavia Deputy Public Prosecutor Vincenzo Calia ascertained that the crash was caused by the explosion of ca. 100 gr. of Composition B planted behind the instrument panel and directly on the landing gear lowering mechanism.

At the time of his death, Bertuzzi had logged 11,236 flying hours of which 625 were on the MS.760 aircraft.

Honors and awards
 Silver Medal of Military Valor (twice)
 Bronze Medal of Military Valor

Bibliography
 Martino Aichner, Giorgio Evangelisti, Storia degli Aerosiluranti italiani e del Gruppo Buscaglia, Longanesi, 1969.

References

External links
 Italian airmen decorated after raid on Gibraltar. Bertuzzi visible with peaked cap.

1919 births
1962 deaths
Aviators killed in aviation accidents or incidents in Italy
Italian World War II pilots
People from Rimini
Recipients of the Silver Medal of Military Valor
Recipients of the Bronze Medal of Military Valor
Regia Aeronautica personnel of World War II
Victims of aviation accidents or incidents in 1962